Ružica Meglaj-Rimac (15 February 1941 – 11 July 1996) was a former Yugoslav and Croatian basketball player born in Croatian-Slovenian family. The Ružica Meglaj-Rimac Cup is named after her.

Personal life
Her younger sister, Kornelija Meglaj is also a former basketball player. She had two sons, former Croatian basketball players Slaven Rimac and Davor Rimac.

References

External links
 Jovan Kosijer, Ružica Meglaj Rimac, Pop&Pop, Zagreb, 2006., 

1941 births
1996 deaths
Basketball players from Zagreb
Croatian women's basketball players
Yugoslav women's basketball players
Croatian people of Slovenian descent
Burials at Mirogoj Cemetery